Dasol Kim (born 1989) is a South Korean pianist.

Born in Busan, Kim started playing the piano at the age of 11, and by 15 won his first international competition and left for Germany. He is a graduate of Hochschule für Musik, Theater und Medien Hannover and studied with Arie Vardi.

Kim won the Young Concert Artists International Auditions in Leipzig in 2010 and in New York in 2015. Additionally, he won First Prize in the 2011 Epinal International Piano Competition in France, and Second Prize in the 2012 Concours Géza Anda in Switzerland. In 2012 he also won the Kissinger Klavierolymp, the piano competition of the festival Kissinger Sommer. He won a Jury Discretionary Award at the 2017 Van Cliburn International Piano Competition in the United States; Fort Worth Star-Telegram enthusiastically wrote that Kim "dominated" in his preliminary round recital.

Kim has appeared as soloist with such orchestras as the New York Philharmonic, the Fort Worth Symphony Orchestra, the Tonhalle Orchestra Zurich, the Berlin Konzerthaus Orchestra, the Bavarian Radio Symphony Orchestra, the Orchestre de la Suisse Romande, the Brandenburg Chamber Orchestra, the MDR Leipzig Radio Symphony Orchestra, Concerto Budapest, and the Belgium National Orchestra. He has been engaged to perform the complete Beethoven piano sonatas in Switzerland and Korea.

Kim's debut album, of works by Robert Schumann, was released on Deutsche Grammophon in 2015. He lives in Berlin and currently holds the Mortimer Levitt Piano Chair of Young Concert Artists.

References 

1989 births
Living people
South Korean pianists
21st-century pianists